Pseudotetracha corpulenta is a species of tiger beetle in the subfamily Cicindelinae that was described by George Henry Horn in 1907. It is endemic to Australia.

References

Beetles described in 1907
Endemic fauna of Australia
Beetles of Australia